Morse's Greatest Mystery and Other Stories is a book by Colin Dexter. First published in 1993, it is a collection of eleven short stories, six of which feature Inspector Morse. In 1996, Dexter received a Macavity Award for Best Mystery Short Story for "Evans Tries an O-Level". The collection was also published under the title As Good as Gold in 1994 as a special paperback edition, commissioned by Kodak.

Contents
 "As Good as Gold" (Morse)
 "Morse's Greatest Mystery" (Morse)
 "Evans Tries an O-Level"
 "Dead as a Dodo" (Morse)
 "At the Lulu-Bar Motel"
 "Neighbourhood Watch" (Morse)
 "A Case of Mis-Identity" (a Sherlock Holmes pastiche)
 "The Inside Story" (Morse)
 "Monty's Revolver"
 "The Carpet-Bagger"
 "Last Call" (Morse)

Publication history
1993 London: Macmillan , Pub date 5 November 1993, Hardcover; without "As Good as Gold"
1994 London: Pan Books , Pub date 4 March 1994, Paperback; without "As Good as Gold"
1994 London: Macmillan , Pub date 2 December 1994, Paperback
1994 London: Pan, Pub date 1994, Paperback, 282p.;  as As Good as Gold, special edition, commissioned by Kodak
1995 London: Pan Books , Pub date 7 April 1995, Paperback
1995 New York : Crown Publishers , Pub date 14 November 1995, Hardcover; First US edition
1996 New York: Fawcett , Pub date 2 November 1996, Paperback
1998 London: Pan Books , Pub date 1998, Paperback; Promotional edition which only includes "Morse's Greatest Mystery", "Evans Tries an O-Level", "Dead as a Dodo", "At the Lulu Bar Motel", "Neignbourhood Watch" and "A Case of Mis-Identity".

1993 short story collections
Crime short story collections
Inspector Morse
British short story collections